The 2016 edition of the Judo Grand Slam Tokyo was held in Tokyo, Japan, from 2 to 4 December 2016.

Medal summary

Men's events

Women's events

Source Results

Medal table

References

External links
 

2016 IJF World Tour
2016 Judo Grand Slam
Judo
Grand Slam, 2016
Judo
Judo